The International Children Assistance Network (ICAN) is a non-profit organization providing help for parents, caregivers and the general population in promoting the healthy development of children from before birth to the age of five. The activities of ICAN are mainly dedicated to the Vietnamese-American community. It was founded in 2000 by Thich Phap Chon, Ivy Vuong and Quyen Vuong and is based in Milpitas, California.

The organization implemented a project in Vietnam called "Strategy to Promote Public Awareness of Vietnamese Children's Health and Safety Issues". This project resulted in total spending of about $25,000 USD in 2004.

See also
List of non-governmental organizations in Vietnam

References

 "California Ballot Measures Would Have Negative Effect On Health Care Access For Children, Immigrants, Minority Advocacy Groups Say" - Medical News Today
 "ADAPT: Mekong Delta Alliance to Prevent Human Trafficking" - New America Media
 "Smoothing Paths in Two Countries" - Stanford Business
 "$1.2 Million in Grants to Promote Health, Well Being of Local Children" - Lucile Packard Foundation
 "NON-PROFIT CHARGES GRANT LIMITS ARE UNFAIR,  CITY SAYS TOBACCO-SETTLEMENT FUNDS DOWN" - San Jose Mercury News
 "Glitches remain in Census count" - USA Today
 "10 finalists for ExCEL Awards to be recognized during KU homecoming events" - KU
 "Young Vietnamese Americans giving back to their home country" - Nguoi Viet 2
 "Anti-Trafficking Initiative" - East Meets West Foundation
 "Asian American Groups Thank Census Bureau for Corrected Census 2010 Translation" - Asian American Justice Center

External links
 ICAN Official web page 

Charities based in California
Children's charities based in the United States
2000 establishments in California
Organizations established in 2000
Vietnamese-American culture in California